Frederik Michal Anker Wandahl (born 9 May 2001) is a Danish cyclist, who currently rides for UCI WorldTeam .

Major results
2018
 1st  Road race, National Junior Road Championships
 2nd Johan Museeuw Classic - G.P. Stad Gistel
 4th Overall Saarland Trofeo
1st  Young rider classification
1st Stage 1
 5th Road race, UCI Junior Road World Championships
 5th Trofeo Emilio Paganessi
2019
 2nd Road race, National Junior Road Championships
 2nd Trofeo Emilio Paganessi
 6th Trofeo Comune di Vertova - Memorial Pietro Merelli
 8th Road race, UCI Junior Road World Championships
2021
 2nd Road race, National Road Championships
2022
 8th Overall Tour de Wallonie
 10th Gran Piemonte

References

External links

2001 births
Living people
Danish male cyclists
People from Vellinge Municipality
Sportspeople from Skåne County
21st-century Danish people